New York or Niu-York is an urban settlement in Toretsk urban hromada of Bakhmut Raion of Donetsk Oblast, at 37.9 km NNE from the centre of Donetsk city. From 1951 to 2021, the settlement was named Novhorodske.

New York is administratively subordinated to Toretsk city, that is located about 10 km north of New York. Population:

Name and etymology

The first official mention of the name of New York (Нью-Йорк) dates back to 1859 as one of the results of the census of the Yekaterinoslav Governorate, then part of the Russian Empire.

The existence of New York is therefore a fact. But the origin of the name remains a mystery that is the subject of many local legends. It could come from an entrepreneur or local dignitary who would have settled in the United States, who would have settled from the United States or who would have had as a partner an American citizen from New York City. Another explanation refers to the city of Jork, currently in northern Germany, where Mennonite settlers may have come from. The local historian Viktor Kovalov thus believes that the name of the locality may have corresponded to "Neu Jork" (new Jork) and evolved over time. It may also be the result of a transliteration error from the Latin alphabet to the Cyrillic alphabet. However, the establishment of the Mennonites officially dates back to 1889, whereas the name New York predates it. Another track recalls that names with a European evocation were frequent in the region in the 19th century. Historical maps show a "Swiss farm" near Druzhkivka or a hamlet called "Carthage" around Soledar. Also, historian Viktor Kovalov does not rule out the possibility of a joke.

On October 19, 1951, in the context of the Cold War, an ukase (decree) of the Presidium of the Supreme Soviet of the Ukrainian Soviet Socialist Republic ordered the change of name to Novhorodske (literally translated as "new city").

From the start of the Donbass war in Spring 2014, the local authorities, together with citizen groups, undertook to restore the historical name of the locality. In the wave of name changes required by the so-called “decommunization” laws of 2015, the City Council validated the return to New York. Regional and national authorities did not act on it for many years though. Among other reasons, it was because of the special status imposed on towns located in the war zone.

The request to change the name of the locality to New York that was submitted by the civil-military administration of Donetsk Oblast was finally approved by the Committee of the Ukrainian parliament on the organization of state power, local self-government, regional development and urban planning on 3 February 2021 (18 votes “for” and 1 “against”). On July 1, 2021, the Ukrainian Parliament renamed the city to its original name New York. The resolution was supported by 301 people's deputies; Yevgeniy Shevchenko was the sole MP who voted "against", 13 MPs from Servant of the People and 12 from Opposition Platform — For Life abstained).

In the context of the invasion of Ukraine, Russian propagandist Olga Skabeyeva promised that Russian authorities would rename New York to Novogorodskoye, Russia's version of Novhorodske, after the city was conquered militarily.

History
The discovery of stone tombs in mounds proves that some human settlement dates back to the Bronze Age. However, the region is made of some arid steppe and various populations did not settle en masse. The current south-east of Ukraine has long been called "Wild Fields".

At the end of the 18th century, Catherine II of Russia completed the conquest of the region. She built new towns and founded the "New Russia" administrative unit. Catherine II and her successors invited German settlers, especially Mennonites, to develop the conquered lands. After the destruction of the Sich in 1775, Zaporozhian Cossacks and mercenaries from the Balkans also settled in the region in order to secure the steps of the empire. In the 1830s, Tsar Nicholas I donated a vast territory to the count Pavel Nikolayevich Ignatiev. The way the region developed is not known.

New York first appeared on maps in 1846. The 1859 census confirmed that the locality then had 13 households, 45 men, 40 women and a factory.

In 1889, Mennonites from the colony of Chortitza (today Zaporizhzhia) acquired a piece of land and founded a factory. Named after its owner and chief engineer, Jakob Niebuhr, it was completed in 1894. In 1892, Mennonites formed the colony of New York from seven settlements. The industrialization of New York was accompanied by the construction of a north-south railway line. At the turn of the 20th century, the colony had electricity, a telegraph, a bank, a hotel, a bookstore, a school for girls and for boys.

In 1916, New York was chosen to host a new naphthalene production plant. Despite the revolution of February 1917, the factory came into operation in July 1917. In the context of rising tensions between the USSR and Nazi Germany that led to World War II, most Mennonite Germans were repatriated, expelled, imprisoned or shot. A few established a colony called New York in the 1930s in Amur Oblast.

New York was occupied by German troops from December 1941 to the fall of 1944. The Petrovsk Machinery Plant (formerly Niebuhr) was transported and rebuilt in Soviet Kazakhstan. The phenol plant was moved to the Moscow region. The two factories were relocated in New York after the conflict.

In 1951, by decree of the Presidium of the Supreme Soviet of the Ukrainian Soviet Socialist Republic, the city was renamed Novhorodske.                           In timesduring the soviet industrialization industry developed in the city, was completed and modernized The Dzerzhinsky phenol plant ; was also built Novgorod Machine-Building Plant named after G.I. Petrovsky, after the collapse of the USSR he ceased to exist, workshops and other buildings were sold out; various production facilities were organized in some, others were mothballed; three workshops were dismantled for building materials.               

As part of the Donbass War, which began in mid-April 2014, New York was occupied by pro-Russian and Russian forces from early May to late July. The fighting caused civilian and military casualties. On November 8, 2016, a civilian was killed by shelling. According to then-Mayor Mykola Lenko, 16 residents lost their lives between 2014 and 2021.

From 2014 till 2022, the town was situated along the frontline between the Ukrainian army and the Russia-backed Donetsk People's Republic of the ongoing War in Donbas.

In 2019, a former house of the German colony was restored and transformed into an exhibition, cultural and artistic hub.

In 2021, the vote of the Verkhovna Rada formalizing the renaming of the city launched a wave of cultural events. On the initiative of the Ukrainian writer Victoria Amelina, whose husband had roots in the settlement, the first "Ukrainian New York literature festival" was held in October. The "New York marathon", inspired by the American event, brought together several dozens of participants at the beginning of November.

As part of the invasion of Ukraine, the phenol factory was bombed on April 5, 2022. More and more inhabitants were evacuated.

In March 19, 2023, Russia hit New York with missile.

Transportation
The phenol train station is New York's train station. It connects the town with Sloviansk in the north and with Donetsk in the south. The southern connection is cut since 2014.

Demographics

Upon Ukraine's declaration of independence, New York's population was estimated at around 20,000 inhabitants.

In 2021, it was estimated at less than 10,000 inhabitants by local authorities.

In 2022, most residents fled or were evacuated in the context of the Russian invasion of Ukraine.

Native language as of the Ukrainian Census of 2001:
Russian 65.74%
Ukrainian 33.95%
Belarusian 0.12%
Armenian 0.03%
German and Polish 0.02%
Romanian 0.01%

References

Bibliography
Sébastien Gobert (texts) and Niels Ackermann (pictures), New York, Ukraine. Guide d'une ville inattendue, éditions Noir sur blanc, 2021, 204 pages.

External links

Urban-type settlements in Bakhmut Raion
Bakhmutsky Uyezd
Former German settlements in Donetsk Oblast